Daniël Boissevain (born 29 June 1969) is a Dutch actor. He appeared in more than fifty films since 1992.

Selected filmography

References

External links 

1969 births
Living people
Dutch male actors
Dutch male film actors
Male actors from Amsterdam
20th-century Dutch male actors
21st-century Dutch male actors